Edward "the boy" Jones (1824 – 26 December 1893) was a Briton who became notorious for breaking into Buckingham Palace multiple times between 1838 and 1841.

Biography

Early life

Edward Jones was the son of a tailor in Westminster.

Arrests
In 1838, aged 14, Jones entered Buckingham Palace disguised as a chimney sweep. He was caught by a porter in the Marble Hall and, after a chase, captured by the Metropolitan Police in St James's Street, with Queen Victoria's underwear stuffed down his trousers. He was brought before Queen Square Police Court on 14 December. It turned out that he had frequently mentioned his intention to enter the palace to his employer, a builder. Although he had apparently stolen linen and a regimental sword from the palace, he was acquitted by the jury.

On 30 November 1840, nine days after the birth of Queen Victoria's first child, Princess Victoria, he "scaled the wall of Buckingham Palace about half-way up Constitution Hill", entered the palace, and left undetected. On 1 December 1840, he broke in again. Shortly after midnight, Baroness Lehzen discovered him under a sofa in the Queen's dressing room and he was arrested. His father's plea of insanity being without success, he was sentenced to three months in a house of correction. The 1840 incident caused a stir because initially, it was feared that it might affect the Queen, happening so shortly after childbirth.

Before his release from Tothill Fields Prison on 2 March 1841, attempts were made to persuade Jones to join the Navy. On 15 March 1841, after a snack in one of the royal apartments, "the boy Jones" was caught by the reinforced police force guarding the palace. This time, he was sentenced to three months' hard labour. This third incident caused a furore, and three additional palace guards were appointed.

Later life
After his second release, he refused an offer of £4 a week (£ today) to appear in a music hall, and a short time later, he was caught loitering in the vicinity of Buckingham Palace. After a year, he found an opportunity to walk from Portsmouth to London. Having been caught before he reached the palace, he was sent back to his ship. He was last mentioned in the newspapers in 1844, when he was rescued after going overboard between Tunis and Algiers.

Jones became an alcoholic and a burglar, and later went to Australia, where he became the town crier of Perth.

In the 1880s, Edward Jones adopted the name "Thomas Jones" in a vain attempt to escape his unwanted notoriety. He died on Boxing Day 1893 in Bairnsdale, Australia, after falling off the parapet of the east side of the Mitchell River bridge while drunk and landing on his head. He is buried at the Bairnsdale Cemetery in an unmarked grave.

A memorial plaque at the cemetery, erected by the East Gippsland Historical Society in 2005, states erroneously that he breached security at Windsor Castle (not Buckingham Palace), and also that he was transported to Australia for the intrusion.

Notoriety
Jones became the subject of numerous accounts in newspapers and satirical magazines. In an allusion to Renaissance architect Inigo Jones, it was suggested that because of his "extraordinary powers of finding an entrance into the palace" he must be "a descendant of In-I-Go Jones".

Legacy
Jones' story inspired a children's book by Joan Howard, The Boy Jones, published in 1943.

It also inspired a novel by American artillery sergeant and San Francisco newspaperman Theodore Bonnet, The Mudlark (1949); which was afterwards adapted as a film of the same title, directed by Jean Negulesco and released in 1950. In Bonnet's novel and in the film the central character is renamed Wheeler, he enters Windsor Castle, and he is considerably younger than the real Jones: he is aged 7 in the novel, and 10 in the film. In the movie, the young intruder is portrayed by Andrew Ray.

The story of Jones is a brief storyline in the second season of ITV period drama Victoria, where Jones is portrayed by Tommy Rodger.

See also

 Michael Fagan (intruder)

References

Further reading

1824 births
1893 deaths
Royal Navy sailors
People from Westminster
Buckingham Palace
19th century in London
Accidental deaths from falls
Accidental deaths in Victoria (Australia)
Alcohol-related deaths in Australia